Kerson may refer to:

 Chris Kerson, American actor
 Kerson Hadley (born 1989), Micronesian swimmer
 Kerson Huang (1928–2016), Chinese-American theoretical physicist and translator
 Kerson Leong (born 1997), Canadian violinist

See also
 Kherson (disambiguation)